is a private university in Mizuho, Gifu Prefecture, Japan. The school was first founded in 1971 as Gifu Dental University (岐阜歯科大学 Gifu Shika Daigaku). It was renamed Asahi University in 1985 when the management department was added.

Departments

Undergraduate
Dentistry
Education
Law
Management

Graduate
Dentistry
Management
Law

Sister university
Meikai University

External links
 Official website 

Asahi University
Educational institutions established in 1971
Private universities and colleges in Japan
Mizuho, Gifu